Josefstädter Straße  is a station on  of the Vienna U-Bahn. It is located in the Josefstadt District. It opened in 1989. The station has been temporarily closed, and it was due to reopen on May 23, 2013.

References

External links 
 

Buildings and structures in Josefstadt
Railway stations opened in 1989
Vienna U-Bahn stations